Events from the year 1923 in Ireland.

Incumbents
 Governor-General: Tim Healy
 President of the Executive Council: W. T. Cosgrave (CnaG)

Events
10 January – an order is signed creating the Revenue Commissioners.
13 January – Beechpark, the residence of President W. T. Cosgrave in Dublin, is set on fire.
16 January – Provisional Government of Ireland takes office.
22 January – the Minister for Education, Eoin MacNeill, announces that Irish is to become a subject for examination in the Civil Service.
18 February – an amnesty for IRA Irregulars expires on this day. It was introduced by the Minister for Home Affairs, Kevin O'Higgins.
1 April – the Provisional Government establishes customs posts on the border with Northern Ireland.
11 April – Liam Lynch, Chief of Staff of the Irregulars, is wounded and captured by the Free State's National Army in the Knockmealdown Mountains. His subsequent death in Clonmel is also announced by the army.
14 April – Austin Stack is captured by National Army troops at the foot of the Knockmealdown Mountains.
30 April – thousands turn up to greet Jim Larkin as he returns to Ireland after a nine-year absence in the United States.
28 May – the Government releases two captured documents issued by the IRA on 24 May. The letters, signed by Éamon de Valera and Frank Aiken (the new Chief of Staff) call for the dumping of arms and the ending of armed struggle. The Civil War is officially over.
31 May – obelisk of 1736 commemorating the Battle of the Boyne (1690) at Oldbridge (County Meath) is blown up.
20 July – Éamon de Valera appeals to the American Association for the Recognition of the Irish Republic for $100,000 to fight the upcoming general election.
August – the British Royal Navy patrol ship HMY Helga is handed over to the Irish Coastal and Marine Service as the Public Armed Ship Muirchú.
2  August – Joe Whitty dies on an independent hunger strike, the first of three IRA men to die in the 1923 Irish Hunger Strikes.
15 August – Éamon de Valera is arrested at an election meeting in Ennis, County Clare.
27 August – 1923 Irish general election: Cumann na nGaedheal under W. T. Cosgrave win most seats and form a minority government.
10 September – Ireland is admitted into the League of Nations.
17 September – 33 members present themselves at Leinster House for the swearing in of the new Dáil. No anti-Treaty republicans attend.
19 September – the Fourth Dáil meets for the first time at Leinster House. Michael Hayes is elected Ceann Comhairle and W. T. Cosgrave is elected President of the Executive Council.
13 October–23 November – 1923 Irish Hunger Strikes: IRA prisoners in Irish gaols stage a hunger strike; two die.
15 October – the Mallow Viaduct over the River Blackwater is officially re-opened by President W. T. Cosgrave.
14 November – the Nobel Prize for Literature is awarded to poet and playwright W. B. Yeats.
Full date unknown
The Royal Bank of Ireland buys the Irish Free State business of the Belfast Banking Company, which in turn buys the Northern Ireland business of the Royal Bank of Ireland. See Allied Irish Banks.
The General Assembly of the Church of Scotland calls for curbs on the immigration of Irish Catholics.

Arts and literature
11 April – Seán O'Casey's drama The Shadow of a Gunman, the first of his "Dublin Trilogy" (set in 1920), opens at the Abbey Theatre, Dublin.
W. B. Yeats is awarded the Nobel Prize in Literature. He also publishes his poetry The Cat and the Moon (including "Leda and the Swan").
Elizabeth Bowen publishes her first book, a collection of short stories, Encounters, in London.
Liam O'Flaherty publishes his first novel, Thy Neighbour's Wife.
Mainie Jellett's Decoration is among the first abstract paintings shown in Ireland when it is exhibited at the Society of Dublin Painters Group Show.

Sports

Boxing
World light heavyweight championship
Winners: Mike McTigue defeated Battling Siki for the title on St Patrick's Day, 1923, at La Scala Theatre, Dublin.

Football

League of Ireland
Winners: Shamrock Rovers
FAI Cup
Winners: Alton United 1 - 0 Shelbourne. Played at Dalymount Park, Dublin, on 17 March 1923.
Belfast side Alton United of the Falls District League are shock winners of the Free State Cup beating Shelbourne 1–0 in the final at Dalymount Park. Clubs and leagues in republican areas of Northern Ireland had affiliated to the FA of the Irish Free State after the 1921 split from the Belfast-based Irish Football Association.

Gaelic Games
The All-Ireland Champions are Galway (hurling) and Dublin (Gaelic football)

Births
2 January – Cathal Goulding, Chief of Staff of the Irish Republican Army and the Official IRA (died 1998).
15 January – Tommy Eglington, soccer player (died 2004).
31 January – Joseph Burke, cricketer.
9 February – Brendan Behan, poet, novelist and playwright (died 1964).
20 March – Con Martin, soccer player and manager.
8 April – Edward Mulhare, actor (died 1997).
2 May – Patrick Hillery, former Fianna Fáil TD, Cabinet Minister, European Commissioner and sixth President of Ireland (died 2008).
24 May – Siobhán McKenna, née Siobhán Giollamhuire Nic Cionnaith, actress (died 1986).
May – Seán Óg Ó Ceallacháin, journalist, author and broadcaster (died 2013).
23 June – Peter Corr, international soccer player and father of The Corrs members (died 2001).
8 July – John Wilson, Fianna Fáil TD and Cabinet Minister, former Cavan Gaelic footballer (died 2007).
10 September – Mickey Byrne, Tipperary hurler (died 2016).
23 September – Seán Treacy, Labour Party Teachta Dála for Tipperary South, Ceann Comhairle of Dáil Éireann (died 2018).
29 October – Paddy Donegan, Fine Gael TD and Cabinet Minister (died 2000).
10 November – Tommy Moroney, soccer and rugby player (died 1981).
17 December – Dennis Flynn, soldier in Canada, Chairman of the Municipality of Metropolitan Toronto (died 2003).
21 December – Scott Huey, cricketer.
25 December – Jim Tunney, Fianna Fáil TD, Minister of State and Lord Mayor of Dublin (died 2002).
28 December – Anthony Cronin, poet (died 2016).
Full date unknown
Seán Condon, Cork hurler (died 2001).
Kathleen Mills, camogie player (died 1996).

Deaths
28 January – George Richardson, soldier, recipient of the Victoria Cross for gallantry in 1859 at Kewane Trans-Gogra, India (born 1831).
25 March – Thomas Crean, recipient of the Victoria Cross for gallantry in 1901 at Tygerkloof Spruit, South Africa (born 1873).
10 April – Liam Lynch, commanding general of the anti-Treaty Irish Republican Army during the Irish Civil War, shot and killed (born 1893).
17 April – Laurence Ginnell, nationalist, lawyer and politician, member of 1st Dáil (born 1852).
23 April – Seán Etchingham, Sinn Féin politician, member of 1st Dáil, Cabinet Minister.
29 April – Robert Carew, 3rd Baron Carew (born 1860).
11 June – Herbert Trench, poet (born 1865).
16 July – Sydney Mary Thompson, geologist and botanist (born 1847).
9 August – O'Moore Creagh, soldier, recipient of the Victoria Cross for gallantry in 1879 at Kam Dakka, Afghanistan (born 1848).
20 October – Thomas MacPartlin, trade union official, elected to 1922 Seanad.
9 November – Maurice Healy, lawyer, politician and MP (born 1859).
20 November – Denny Barry, Irish Republican, died during the 1923 Irish Hunger Strikes, shortly after the Irish Civil War (born 1883).
22 November - Andy O'Sullivan (Irish Republican), died after 40 days on hunger strike in St. Bricin's Military Hospital, Dublin during the 1923 Irish Hunger Strikes.
5 December – Edward Martyn, playwright and activist (born 1859).

References

 
1920s in Ireland
Ireland
Years of the 20th century in Ireland